Soesdyke is a village in the Demerara-Mahaica Region (Region 4), Guyana, located between the Demerara River and the East Bank Public Road. Soesdyke is located just after the village called Den Heuvel (Coverden) if you are coming from Georgetown, which is the capital of Guyana. On the other end of Soesdyke is the village Timehri about 3 miles northeast of the Cheddi Jagan International Airport.

The village started as the plantation Soesdyke which was owned by Laurens Storm van 's Gravesande, the governor of Essequibo and Demerara. Van Gravesande, moved the government of the colony to the nearby island of Borsselen (also Borslem) in the Demerara River.

Population and Economy
In 2012, the official census recorded a population of 156 people in Soesdyke. Residents are predominantly of East Indian descent. The main religion in Soesdyke is Hinduism, with a small number of peoples adhering to Muslim or Christian faiths. The main economic activities in the region are agriculture, hunting and forestry.

Notable people
 Fred Abraham (1886–1918), cricket player

References

Populated places in Demerara-Mahaica